Pseudoschrankia epichalca is a moth of the family Noctuidae. It was first described by Edward Meyrick in 1899. It is endemic to the island of Hawaii.

It has a variable black and yellow pattern.

External links

Hypeninae
Endemic moths of Hawaii
Moths described in 1899